Sandy Harbutt (1941 – 21 November 2020) was an Australian actor, writer and director, best known for the bikie film, Stone (1974). Although it was very successful at the box office, it was the only feature he ever directed. He was once married to actress Helen Morse.

Biography 
Harbutt was born in Randwick, New South Wales and studied law before turning to advertising and then acting. He worked extensively in theatre, particularly at Sydney's Ensemble Theatre, and appeared in the TV series The Long Arm. He died 21 November 2020 at Wollongong Hospital, aged 79.

Unmade Projects
Harbutt only made one feature film. Among the projects he tried to make included:
Strike about the Builders Labourers Federation
a film adaptation of Drums of Mer by Ion Idriess.
The Reaper about a Nazi war criminal in West Australia;
Action a look at the film industry through the eyes of a stuntman.
In 2009 it was reported he was working on a bikie musical.

Producer David Hannay who worked with Harbutt on Stone said the most "negative experience" he had as a filmmaker in a career of over three decades was not being able to get finance for Harbutt to make another film:
Why have I failed? What is wrong with me? I have failed this person who is such an important part of my life, this person with enormous talent, this extraordinary human being, and I have failed him totally and absolutely. It really is the major low point in my life; if I really dwell on it, I get very angry.... I should have made a difference. Because I should have been able to make it happen. He is far more talented than 999 of the 1000 other people I know... You understand, of course, that he is his own producer. It is not a question of whether he would go to another producer. If he felt so inclined, he would. But, apart from anything else, Sandy needs somebody who is prepared to fold themselves into what he wants to do and be committed to that. That is something you would have to talk to him about.

Filmography 
 1970 Squeeze a Flower - Grape picker.
 1974 Stone - Undertaker.

References

External links
Sandy Harbutt theatre credits at AusStage

Australian film directors
1941 births
2020 deaths